Ibrahim Aziz (born 1938) is a Turkish Cypriot political analyst living in Nicosia, Republic of Cyprus. Aziz was the president of the New Cyprus Association in 1998. He is a former member of AKEL.

Although he is a citizen of the Republic of Cyprus and lives in the area controlled by it, he was not allowed to vote because he was a Turkish Cypriot for forty years. He applied to the European Court of Human Rights in 2004, and the court ruled:
Consequently, the applicant, as a member of the Turkish–Cypriot community living in the Government-controlled area of Cyprus, was completely deprived of any opportunity to express his opinion in the choice of the members of the house of representatives of the country of which he was a national and where he had always lived. Considering that the very essence of the applicant's right to vote, as guaranteed by Article 3 of Protocol No. 1, had been denied, the Court held, unanimously, that there had been a violation of Article 3 of Protocol No. 1.

After this case, the right to vote was given to the Turkish Cypriots residing in the Republic of Cyprus. However, Turkish Cypriots still cannot run in presidential elections and the Turkish Cypriots which reside in Northern Cyprus cannot vote in elections, even though they are citizens of the Republic of Cyprus.

Works 
 Ibrahim Aziz (2011), "Ματιά στο Παρασκήνιο" [A Look at the Backstage], Nicosia

See also 
 Human rights in Cyprus

References 

Human rights abuses in Cyprus
1938 births
Turkish Cypriot political writers
Living people